Lupe Rumazo Cobo (born October 14, 1933) is an Ecuadorian writer. She is the author of 11 books of essays, short stories and novels.

Cobo was born in Quito, the daughter of Ecuadorian historian Alfonso Rumazo González.  Her books have been prologued by authors such as Ernesto Sábato, Juana de Ibarbourou, and Benjamín Carrión. She is a member of the Ecuadorian Academy of Language, the House of Ecuadorian Culture, and the Circle of Venezuelan Writers. She resides in Venezuela.

Personal life
In 1956 she married the notable violinist Gerardo Alzamora Vela, the Director the Music Conservatory of Quito, who she had met in Colombia.

Works
 En el lagar (1961)
 Sílabas de la tierra (Cuentos) (1964)
 Yunques y crisoles americanos (ensayos) (1967)
 Rol beligerante (ensayo) (2003)
 Carta larga sin final (1978)
 Peste blanca, peste negra (Novela) (1988)
 Vivir en el exilio, tallar en nubes (1992)
 Escalera de piedra
 Los Marcapasos (2011)
 Documentos prescindibles e imprescindibles y Temporal
 Vida y Obra de Alfonso Rumazo González

References 

1933 births
Ecuadorian women writers
People from Quito
Living people
Tulane University alumni
Ecuadorian essayists
Ecuadorian women short story writers
Ecuadorian short story writers
20th-century novelists
20th-century Ecuadorian women writers
Ecuadorian novelists
Ecuadorian women novelists
Ecuadorian women essayists
21st-century Ecuadorian women writers
20th-century short story writers
21st-century short story writers
20th-century essayists
21st-century essayists